Nilüfer Hatun (birth name Holifere (Holophira) / Olivera, other names Bayalun, Beylun, Beyalun, Bilun, Suyun, Suylun) was a Valide Hatun; the wife of Orhan, the second Ottoman sultan. She was mother of the next sultan, Murad I.

Biography
The traditional stories about her origin, traced back to the 15th century, are that she was daughter of the Byzantine ruler (Tekfur) of Bilecik, called Holofira. As some stories go, Orhan's father Osman raided Bilecik at the time of Holofira's wedding arriving there with rich presents and disguised and hidden soldiers. Holofira was among the loot and given to Orhan.

However modern researchers doubt this story, admitting that it may have been based on real events. Doubts are based on a lack of direct evidence from the time. In addition there is secondary evidence of an alternate origin, in particular her Ottoman name Nilüfer meaning  water lily in the Persian language.

Other historians make her a daughter of the Prince of Yarhisar or a Byzantine Princess Helen (Nilüfer), who was of ethnic Greek descent.

According to a source, in the spring of 1299, the Bilecik magistrate who was to marry the daughter of Yarhisar invited Osman Ghazi and his men to his wedding festivity. In the spring the Söğüt people migrated to Domaniς plateau until autumn. Osman Ghazi asked to leave all his belongings at the Bilecik castle before coming to the wedding. It was the usual practice in those years to entrust the heavy goods of encampment to neighbouring castles. The magistrate accepted gladly. The wedding would be in Chakirpinar, two hours away from Bilecik. On the way to the wedding, the magistrate of Yarhisar was encircled by Osman's soldiers. They turned back toward Yarhisar. When the people saw their magistrate, they opened the gates and Osman's soldiers got in. The conquest of the castle did not take long. At the Bilecik castle, one of the bales left by Osman Ghazi was opened. A soldier got out of it and informed others. Armed soldiers stepping out of the bales captured everyone in the castle. Bilecik had fallen to the Ottomans. While the guests were waiting for the bride, the horsemen of the Ottomans appeared. There was a big ceremony in Karacahisar. Orhan Ghazi would marry Holofira, the daughter of the Yarhisar magistrate. The young bride converted to Islam and became Nilüfer Hatun.

Nilüfer Hatun Imareti ("Nilüfer Hatun Soup Kitchen"), a convent annex hospice for dervishes, now housing the Iznik Museum in İznik, Bursa Province, was built by Sultan Murad in 1388 to honor his mother after her death.

Issue 
Murad I: (1326 – 15 June 1389). Assassinated by Miloš Obilić during the Battle of Kosovo.

See also
Ottoman Empire
Ottoman family tree
Ottoman dynasty
Line of succession to the Ottoman throne
Ottoman Emperors family tree (simplified)
List of the mothers of the Ottoman Sultans
List of consorts of the Ottoman Sultans

Notes and references

Further reading
 Yavuz  Bahadıroğlu, Resimli Osmanlı Tarihi, Nesil Yayınları (Ottoman History with Illustrations, Nesil Publications), 15th Ed., 2009,  (Hardcover).

14th-century consorts of Ottoman sultans
Centenarians from the Ottoman Empire
Converts to Islam from Eastern Orthodoxy
Former Greek Orthodox Christians
People from Bilecik
People from the Ottoman Empire of Greek descent
Valide sultan
Women centenarians